Ruthven is a city in Palo Alto County, Iowa, United States. The population was 725 at the time of the 2020 census.

History
Ruthven had its start in the year 1878 by the building of the Milwaukee railroad through that territory. It was named for the Ruthven brothers, who owned the town site.

Geography
Ruthven is located at  (43.130448, -94.900207).

Demographics

2010 census
At the 2010 census there were 737 people in 320 households, including 184 families, in the city. The racial makup of the city was 99.1% White, 0.5% Native American, and 0.4% from two or more races. Hispanic or Latino of any race were 0.8%.

Of the 320 households 25.0% had children under the age of 18 living with them, 43.1% were married couples living together, 8.1% had a female householder with no husband present, 6.3% had a male householder with no wife present, and 42.5% were non-families. 36.6% of households were one person and 21.2% were one person aged 65 or older. The average household size was 2.21 and the average family size was 2.91.

The median age was 42.2 years. 22.3% of residents were under the age of 18; 7.4% were between the ages of 18 and 24; 22.6% were from 25 to 44; 21.5% were from 45 to 64; and 26.2% were 65 or older. The gender makeup of the city was 47.4% male and 52.6% female.

2000 census
At the 2000 census there were 711 people in 325 households, including 202 families, in the city. The racial makup of the city was 97.19% White, 0.42% Native American, 0.28% Asian, and 2.11% from two or more races. Hispanic or Latino of any race were 1.41%.

Of the 325 households 24.0% had children under the age of 18 living with them, 49.8% were married couples living together, 8.6% had a female householder with no husband present, and 37.8% were non-families. 32.3% of households were one person and 18.2% were one person aged 65 or older. The average household size was 2.19 and the average family size was 2.76.

20.0% were under the age of 18, 10.7% from 18 to 24, 22.4% from 25 to 44, 21.1% from 45 to 64, and 25.9% were 65 or older. The median age was 42 years. For every 100 females, there were 92.2 males. For every 100 females age 18 and over, there were 89.7 males.

The median household income was $31,027 and the median family income  was $40,469. Males had a median income of $26,094 versus $16,719 for females. The per capita income for the city was $17,079. About 4.7% of families and 9.0% of the population were below the poverty line, including 8.5% of those under age 18 and 9.1% of those age 65 or over.

Education
Ruthven-Ayrshire Community School District serves the community. It was a part of the Ruthven Community School District until July 1, 1983, when it merged into Ruthven-Ayrshire.

References

External links
 Community website
 Ruthven Theatre

Cities in Palo Alto County, Iowa
Cities in Iowa